Eko, formerly known as Interlude, is a media and technology company that enables production and web distribution of interactive multimedia videos. The software was used for the Sony produced music video for Bob Dylan's Like A Rolling Stone. Interlude was originally founded in 2010 and was rebranded as Eko in December 2016.

Technology 
Eko software constructs audiovisual multimedia within which users have selection options for streaming choices from a traversable video tree. The availability of different video streams allows for a change in viewer perspective or for narrative-branching.

Structure 
Eko was founded by Israeli rock musician Yoni Bloch. Eko is based in New York and Tel Aviv, and is backed by Sequoia Capital, Intel Capital, New Enterprise Associates, Marker LLC, Innovation Endeavors, Warner Music Group, Sony Pictures, Samsung, and Walmart.

Awards 
 2013: Yoni Bloch was awarded the Prime Minister's Prize for Initiatives and Innovation for Interlude
 2014: Best Small Digital Agency
 2014: the Sony interactive music video for Bob Dylan's Like A Rolling Stone won four Gold Lions; several sources name it as one of the best music videos of 2013.

References

External links
 
 Treehouse

Software companies established in 2010
Video software
American companies established in 2010
Israeli companies established in 2010